The hunter versus farmer hypothesis is a proposed explanation of the nature of attention-deficit hyperactivity disorder (ADHD) first suggested by radio host Thom Hartmann in his book Attention Deficit Disorder: A Different Perception. This hypothesis proposes that ADHD represents a lack of adaptation of members of hunter-gatherer societies to their transformation into farming societies. Hartmann developed the idea first as a mental model after his own son was diagnosed with ADHD, stating, "It's not hard science, and was never intended to be."

A key component of the hypothesis is that the proposed "hyperfocus" aspect of ADHD is a gift or benefit under appropriate circumstances. The hypothesis also explains the distractibility factor in ADHD individuals and their short attention span for subject matter that does not interest the individual (which may or may not trigger hyperfocus), along with various other characteristics such as difficulty adhering to social norms, poor planning and organizing ability, distorted sense of time, impatience, attraction to variety or novelty or excitement, and impulsiveness.  It is argued that in the hunter-gatherer cultures that preceded farming societies, hunters needed hyperfocus more than gatherers.

Hypothesis claims
The hunter versus farmer hypothesis proposes that the high frequency of ADHD in contemporary settings "represents otherwise normal behavioral strategies that become maladaptive in such evolutionarily novel environments as the formal school classroom." One example such as migration in the hunter-gatherer society, is that some of these hunter-gatherers that naturally predisposed to these various amounts of this same gene may have value in certain kinds or qualities of social groups. It was also stated that the lack of 'hyperfocus' should not be the only dichotomy of 'Farmers versus Hunter-gatherers' that was identified in Hartman's theory.

Hartmann claims that most or all humans were nomadic hunter-gatherers for hundreds of thousands of years, but that this standard gradually changed as agriculture developed in most societies, and more people worldwide became farmers. Over many years, most humans adapted to farming cultures, but Hartmann speculates that people with ADHD retained some of the older hunter characteristics.

Scientific basis

Hyperfocus
From an evolutionary viewpoint, "hyperfocus" was advantageous, conferring superb hunting skills and a prompt response to predators. Also, hominins have been hunter gatherers throughout 90% of human history from the beginning, before evolutionary changes, fire-making, and countless breakthroughs in stone-age societies. Humans devised better innovations and organizational structures to boost their living and the need for hyperactivity slowly diminished over a long period of time regardless of whether they were in a gathering or farming society. K. H. Ko further states that the decreased need for 'hyperfocus' was building the conditions favourable for human language.

Glickman & Dodd (1998) found that adults with self-reported ADHD scored higher than other adults on self-reported ability to hyper-focus on "urgent tasks", such as last-minute projects or preparations. Adults in the ADHD group were uniquely able to postpone eating, sleeping and other personal needs and stay absorbed in the "urgent task" for an extended time.

Positive/negative gene selection
Genetic variants (such as DRD4 7R allele) conferring susceptibility to ADHD are very frequent — implying that the trait had provided selective advantage in the past. However, "it is unlikely that the observed bias towards nonsynonymous amino-acid changes has been achieved only by positive selection favoring the DRD4 7R allele because the bias can be found not only in VNTR motifs of the DRD4 7R allele but also in those of the other alleles", observed by more recent research — the DRD4 7R allele had no evidence for recent positive selection.  Furthermore, a recent 2020 study found that ADHD allele frequency has been decreasing for up to 35,000 years, indicating negative selection. These conclusions however, are still compatible with the theory: "Overall, our results are compatible with the mismatch theory for ADHD but suggest a much older time frame for the evolution of ADHD-associated alleles compared to previous hypotheses."

Frequency of ADHD in nomadic tribes
A 2008 New Scientist article by Tim Callaway reports that research of ADHD and related traits in different cultures offers some support for the hunter versus farmer hypothesis. According to evolutionary anthropologist Ben Campbell of the University of Wisconsin–Milwaukee, studies of the Ariaal, an isolated nomadic group in Kenya, suggest that hyperactivity and impulsivity—key traits of ADHD—have distinct advantages to nomadic peoples. Additionally, nomadic Ariaal have high rates of a genetic mutation linked to ADHD, while more settled Ariaal populations have lower rates of this mutation. Henry Harpending of the University of Utah reports that with this genetic mutation, "You probably do better in a context of aggressive competition."

A genetic variant associated with ADHD has been found at higher frequency in more nomadic populations and those with more of a history of migration. Consistent with this the health status of nomadic Ariaal men was higher if they had the ADHD associated genetic variant (7R alleles), whereas in recently sedentary (non-nomadic) Ariaal those with 7R alleles seemed to have slightly worse health.

See also
Continuum concept
Neurodiversity
Controversy about ADHD
Adult ADHD

References

Sources
Hartmann, Thom, Attention Deficit Disorder: A Different Perception

Further reading
Hartmann, Thom  "Attention Deficit Disorder, A Different Perception" subtitled "A Hunter in a Farmers World".
 Dein, S. (2015) "Hunters in a Farmer's World: ADHD and Hunter Gatherers" Anthropology 3:1.

External links
National Mental Health association, AADD webspage
Adult Attention Deficit Disorder website with links
Helpguide: ADHD or ADD: Signs, Symptoms, and Subtypes
Article on Hunter Farmer Theory
"What is a Hunter-type?" Article
"Genomic analysis of the natural history of attention-deficit/hyperactivity disorder using Neanderthal and ancient Homo sapiens samples" Article 
"The evolution of hyperactivity, impulsivity and cognitive diversity" Article

Attention deficit hyperactivity disorder
Evolutionary psychology